The Everest Framework is an open-source framework used to assist software developers in the digital health sector to create HL7v3 messages in Pan-Canadian or Universal formats.

The framework was developed by Mohawk College used for HL7 version 3 messaging and CDA Document processing called the "Everest Framework". This framework is available for Java and .NET and comes with extensive examples and documentation on how to use HL7v3 messaging. Support is also available via the CodePlex project page. This framework was developed through grant funding provided by the Natural Sciences and Engineering Research Council of Canada (NSERC) and Canada Health Infoway.

Everest is used in the following products
 MEDIC Client Registry
 OpenIZ
 MEDIC Service Core Framework

The Everest Developer's Guide can be found on Lulu.

References

Health software